The National University of Luján is an Argentine national university, situated in Luján, Buenos Aires Province.

See also
The Latin American Docta
List of Argentine universities
Science and Education in Argentina
Argentine Higher Education Official Site

References

External links

1973 establishments in Argentina
Lujan
Educational institutions established in 1973
Luján, Buenos Aires
Universities in Buenos Aires Province